Bhayandar (station code: BY) is a railway station on the Western line of the Mumbai Suburban Railway network.
 
It is located in the northern most end of the Salsette island, which separates the satellite cities of Vasai Virar from Western Suburbs of Mumbai and Mumbai City District. The next major railway station towards town side is Borivali and the major station towards outer edge of the far flung satellite cities of Mumbai Metropolitan Region Areas is Vasai Road. It has six platforms in present where 4 and 6 are for trains going towards Churchgate and 1 and 5 for trains going towards Virar/Dahanu Road. Here platforms 2 and 3 are used for Bhayandar locals towards BY-Churchgate, BY-Dadar, BY-Bandra, BY-Andheri, BY-Borivali. The station has witnessed escalators recently. A skywalk serving the commuters to Bhayandar directly to east and west is made recently. Trains serve the station 22 hours a day every day; the headway between trains is five minutes during peak periods, with less frequent service at other times. Bhayandar station is also served by three bus services including BEST Transport and  MBMT Transport which serves the other areas in the Western Suburbs and Mumbai City District, and TMT Transport buses, serving the areas of Thane and Navi Mumbai.

References

Transport in Mira-Bhayandar
Railway stations in Thane district
Mumbai Suburban Railway stations
Mumbai WR railway division